Elvis Haxhillari (born 28 April 1994) is an Albanian footballer who plays for Anagennisi. 
he currently has 9 appearances in 8 years for the club as a goalkeeper. Furthermore, prior to signing in 2012, he also trained with the club.

References

1994 births
Living people
Association football goalkeepers
Albanian footballers
Anagennisi Giannitsa F.C. players
Gamma Ethniki players
Albanian expatriate footballers
Expatriate footballers in Greece
Albanian expatriate sportspeople in Greece